The Moran sternwheelers were a set of 12 almost identical sternwheel steamboats built in 1898 by the Moran shipyard in Seattle, Washington to run on the Yukon and tributary rivers in Alaska.

Construction
The Moran sternwheelers were built to take advantage of the huge demand for inland shipping that was caused by the Klondike Gold Rush.  All the vessels were launched the same day, April 23, 1898, every one with steam up in the boiler.  The vessels were all complete by about May 25, 1898.

Transfer to Alaska
All twelve vessels were assembled at Roche Harbor to clear customs, that being the most northerly customs house from which to begin the transfer north, which they were to make under their own power.  Robert Moran himself was on the lead boat, Pilgrim, which was under the command of Capt. Edward Lennan, a highly skilled Alaska pilot.  Accompanying the flotilla were the steam tugs [[Richard Holyoke (steam tug)|Richard Holyoke]] and Resolute, the steam schooner South Coast, and six supply barges.

The long voyage to the mouth of the Yukon River on the Bering Sea was difficult and one of the vessels (Western Star) was wrecked en route.

List of vessels

Notes

 References 
 Affleck, Edward L., A Century of Paddlewheelers in the Pacific Northwest, the Yukon, and Alaska, Alexander Nicolls Press, Vancouver, BC 2000 
 Newell, Gordon R., ed., H.W. McCurdy Marine History of the Pacific Northwest'',  Superior Publishing Co., Seattle, WA (1966)

1898 ships
Steamboats of the Yukon River
Paddle steamers of British Columbia
Steamboats of Alaska
Ships built in Seattle